By a Thread is the ninth studio album by American Southern rock jam band Gov't Mule. The album was released on October 27, 2009, by Evil Teen Records. It is the first album to feature bassist Jorgen Carlsson, who joined the band in 2008, replacing Andy Hess.

On August 17, 2009, the first track of the album, "Broke Down on the Brazos", was made available for listening on Gov't Mule's official website, as well as on the band's Myspace and Facebook pages. The track features the playing of Billy Gibbons, best known as the singer and guitarist for the American blues rock band ZZ Top.

Track listing 
All songs by Warren Haynes, except as noted

Personnel

Gov't Mule 
 Warren Haynes – vocals, guitar
 Matt Abts – drums, percussion
 Danny Louis – keyboards, rhythm guitar
 Jorgen Carlsson – bass

Additional personnel 
 Billy Gibbons – guitar on "Broke Down on the Brazos"
 Andy Hess – bass on "Scenes from a Troubled Mind" and "World Wake Up"
 Gordie Johnson – background vocals on "Scenes from a Troubled Mind"

References 

Gov't Mule albums
2009 albums